Pandulf II is the name of:

Pandulf II of Salerno, the prince of Salerno (981), the second of such princes of the family of the princes of Capua
Pandulf II of Benevento, the prince of Benevento from 981 and prince of Capua (as Pandulf III) from 1008 or 1009 to his death
Pandulf II of Capua (aka the Black (Niger) or the Young), son and successor of Landulf VII of Capua in 1007

ru:Пандульф II